Maina is one of 22 islands in the Aitutaki atoll of the Cook Islands. It is located at the southwestern extreme of Aitutaki Lagoon, five kilometres to the southwest of the main island of Aitutaki. The island is a sand cay 710m long and up to 310m wide. In front of Maina island stands a sandbar known as "Honeymoon Island" named after a Canadian couple who decided to get married here.

References

Islands of Aitutaki